Timofey Pavlovich Lebeshev  (February 20, 1905 —  August 1, 1981) was a Soviet cinematographer. He became an Honored Artist of the RSFSR in 1965 and Honored Artist of the Buryat Autonomous Soviet Socialist Republic in 1976. Also awarded of the Medal  For Labor Valor (1974).

In 1931, he graduated from the State College of Cinematography. He was director of the film studio  Mostehfilm, then Mosfilm.

His son, Pavel Lebeshev, was a Soviet and Russian cinematographer.

Selected filmography
 1936: Party Ticket (second operator)
 1939: A Girl with a Temper
 1943: Bir Ailə
 1950: Cossacks of the Kuban (together with Valentin Pavlov)
 1955: The Crash of the Emirate
 1956: Early Joys
 1957: An Unusual Summer
 1960: Michman Panin
 1961: The Girls
 1963: Silence
 1964: The Hockey Players
 1968: The Shield and the Sword
  1979: Adult Son

References

External links 
 

1905 births
1981 deaths
Soviet cinematographers